Kadayal is a city in Kanniyakumari district in the Indian state of Tamil Nadu.

Demographics
 India census, Kadayal had a population of 19,226. Males constitute 49% of the population and females 51%. Kadayal has an average literacy rate of 77%, higher than the national average of 59.5%: male literacy is 80%, and female literacy is 74%. In Kadayal, 13% of the population is under 6 years of age.

References

Cities and towns in Kanyakumari district